Trans-Colorado Airlines Flight 2286 (operating as Continental Express Flight 2286) was a scheduled domestic passenger flight from Denver, Colorado, to Durango, Colorado, operated for Continental Express by Trans-Colorado Airlines. On 19 January 1988, Flight 2286 crashed onto terrain near Bayfield, Colorado, while on approach to Durango-La Plata County Airport. Out of the seventeen people on board, nine were killed, including both crew members.

The National Transportation Safety Board (NTSB) investigation determined the most probable cause of the accident was the crew's failure to follow the proper descent profile, and that recent cocaine use by the captain was a contributing factor.

Aircraft and crew
On the date of the accident, Trans-Colorado Airlines Flight 2286 was operated using a Fairchild Metro III twin-turboprop aircraft (registration number N68TC). Initially manufactured in 1981, this particular aircraft was acquired by Trans-Colorado in 1986. The Metro III had logged a total of approximately 12,000 flight hours at the time of the accident. The aircraft was not equipped with a cockpit voice recorder or flight data recorder, and the Federal Aviation Administration (FAA) did not require such small regional aircraft to be equipped with such recorders at the time. After the accident, the FAA mandated the installation of flight recorders in all aircraft operating scheduled flights.

The flight was crewed by Captain Stephen S. Silver (36) and First Officer Ralph D. Harvey (42), who joined Trans-Colorado in 1986 and 1987, respectively. Captain Silver had logged 4,184 hours of flight experience, including 3,028 hours on the Fairchild Metro. First Officer Harvey had 8,500 flight hours, with 305 of them on the Fairchild Metro.

Accident
Flight 2286 departed Denver's Stapleton International Airport at 18:20 Mountain Standard Time as a regularly scheduled flight to Durango–La Plata County Airport. A total of fifteen passengers and two pilots were on board.

At 18:53, Flight 2286 reported reaching its cruising altitude of 23,000 feet. Air traffic control advised Flight 2286 of reduced visibility into Durango, with a ceiling of only 800 feet and light snow and fog in the area. At 19:00, controllers asked Flight 2286 whether they wanted to make an Instrument Landing System (ILS) approach to Durango's runway 2, or a non-precision approach to Durango's runway 20. From Flight 2286's location, making the ILS landing would have required backtracking to make the approach to runway 2, adding ten minutes to the flight versus a more direct approach into runway 20. Silver, who had a reputation as a pilot who could make up for lost time, chose the approach to runway 20 because it would save time. He allowed First Officer Harvey to fly the approach into Durango.

At 19:03, Flight 2286 was cleared to begin descending from 23,000 feet. In order to make a direct approach into Durango, Harvey flew in at a rapid descent of 3,000 feet per minute, which was more than three times the rate intended for the approach. At 19:14, Flight 2286 received clearance to approach Durango's runway 20, and reported reaching 14,000 feet. The aircraft continued to descend until it struck the ground, and then pitched up. The aircraft rolled several times before striking the ground again. Flight 2286 eventually slid to a stop approximately five miles from the airport.

One crash survivor hiked through snow for over a mile in an effort to summon help. Both pilots plus seven passengers were killed in the crash.

Investigation and probable cause
Investigators from the National Transportation Safety Board (NTSB) learned that First Officer Harvey had a history of alcohol abuse. However, Harvey had completed a physical exam the day before the crash and was found at that time to be free of alcohol or illegal drugs. In addition, tests on Harvey's body were negative for alcohol or drugs.

During the investigation, however, the NTSB was informed by another pilot that after the crash, he encountered a woman that claimed to be the fiancée of Captain Silver. The woman claimed to have "done a bag of cocaine" with Silver on the night before the accident. The NTSB attempted to contact and interview the woman, but were unsuccessful. However, tests on Silver's body found traces of cocaine and its metabolites in his blood and urine. The NTSB concluded that Silver had likely used cocaine twelve to eighteen hours before the accident, and that his piloting skills were likely degraded as a result of his drug use.

On 4 February 1989, the NTSB issued its final report on Flight 2286, in which it stated its finding of the probable cause of the crash:

In popular culture
The accident and subsequent investigation are the subject of a season 16 episode of the documentary television series Mayday, titled "Dangerous Approach", first broadcast in July 2016.

See also
 Aero Flight 311, a fatal DC-3 accident in 1961 in which both pilots were intoxicated.
 Japan Air Lines Cargo Flight 1045, a fatal DC-8 accident in 1977 where the captain was intoxicated.
 Aeroflot Flight 821, an accident where an intoxicated captain failed to correct a first officer that was challenged by flying with asymmetrical thrust.

References

Aviation accidents and incidents in 1988
Airliner accidents and incidents in Colorado
Accidents and incidents involving the Fairchild Swearingen Metroliner
Airliner accidents and incidents caused by pilot error
Airliner accidents and incidents involving controlled flight into terrain
1988 in Colorado
Aviation accidents and incidents in the United States in 1988
January 1988 events in the United States